El Thour is a settlement in Egypt.

References

Populated places in South Sinai Governorate